Richland Creek is a stream in Howard County in the U.S. state of Missouri. It is a tributary of the Missouri River.

The stream flows to the north for about 2.5 miles, then turns to the west passing under Route 87.

Richland Creek was so named due to the fertile soil along its course.

See also
List of rivers of Missouri

References

Rivers of Howard County, Missouri
Rivers of Missouri